Minuscule 100 (in the Gregory-Aland numbering), A11 (von Soden), is a Greek minuscule manuscript of the New Testament, on parchment. Palaeographically it has been assigned to the 10th century. The manuscript has complex contents and full marginalia.

Description 

The codex contains a complete text of the four Gospels on 374 parchment leaves (size ) with a commentary. The text is written in one column per page, 39-45 lines per page.

There is also a division according to the smaller Ammonian Sections, with references to the Eusebian Canons.

The text of the Gospels is surrounded by a catena.

Text 

The Greek text of the codex is a representative of the Byzantine text-type. Aland placed it in Category V. 
It was not examined by using the Claremont Profile Method.

The text of John 21:25 is omitted.

History 

The manuscript once belonged to Paul de Eibiswald. Wagenseil used it in Hungary for John 8:6. It the 15th century it belonged to John Pannonius Bishop of Pécs. It was examined by Wettstein (possibly 100). It was edited in 1860 in Pesht by Samuel Markfi.

It is currently housed at the Eötvös Loránd University (Cod. Gr. 1), at Budapest.

See also 

 List of New Testament minuscules
 Biblical manuscript
 Textual criticism

References

Further reading 

 Samuel Markfi, "Codex Graecus Quattuor Evangeliorum e Bibliotheca Universitas Pestinensis cum interpretationem Hungarica" (Pest, 1860)
 

Greek New Testament minuscules
10th-century biblical manuscripts